AfterHours is the second studio album by American R&B singer Mack Wilds. It was released on April 7, 2017, by The Ninety Five Percent and EMPIRE. The album features guest appearances from Wale, Tink and Cam Wallace.

Background

The album's title was inspired by the recording process. Mack created AfterHours at night and wanted to reflect this in the content. Wilds “A lot of these songs, when I had a chance to actually record — they were recorded at night," Mack said "while I was shooting 'The Breaks' and 'Shots Fired', that was the only time I had to myself or to even get into the studio. I drew on inspiration that came from looking around and seeing how things change at night time, how things feel at night time. Text messages at 2 a.m. look different than text messages at 2 p.m. Break-ups feel different at night."

Track listing

References

Contemporary R&B albums by American artists
2017 albums
Empire Distribution albums